Operation Rock & Roll was a 1991 concert tour featuring Judas Priest, Alice Cooper, Motörhead, Dangerous Toys and Metal Church. It ran from 9 July 1991 until 19 August 1991 in the United States and Canada. This tour was in honor of the US forces involved in Operation Desert Storm during the Gulf War.  This would also be Judas Priest's final tour with Rob Halford until 2004.

Judas Priest continued to tour in support of Painkiller, with Alice Cooper supporting Hey Stoopid, Motörhead supporting 1916, Dangerous Toys supporting Hellacious Acres and Metal Church supporting The Human Factor.

Rob Halford incident 
On the 19 August 1991 show in Toronto, the last date of the tour, an incident occurred when Rob Halford collided with the drum riser as he was making his entrance onstage on his Harley-Davidson motorcycle as the band was set to perform, breaking his nose in the process. He was left unconscious as "Hell Bent for Leather" was being performed. Crew members struggled to search for Halford in the heavy induced fog, not knowing where he was. After a short while, guitarist Glenn Tipton stumbled upon him on the ground and Halford was then assisted by the crew members. He regained consciousness afterwards and finished the show with a plaster on the bridge of his nose. After the show, he was transferred to the local medical clinic where he was treated for a concussion.

In the 2004 Reunited documentary, Tipton explained that so much dry ice, smoke and pyrotechnics was the primary factor that the center of the stage got stuck, "Rob went down on the ramp on the bike, and, so lucky, he'd actually just caught the top of his head, you know, I mean it could've literally have killed him. And it knocked him off. So we started the number not knowing what had gone on because there was so much dry ice and smoke, until I stepped on Rob, [Laughs] I actually stepped on Rob, 'What's this? On the stage', you know, 'some Priest prop.' And it was Rob and he was stunned so we played the first song which was, I'm not sure whether it was "Electric Eye" or, without him...anyway true to professional form he rallied around and joined us on stage in the second number."

Set lists 

Metal Church setlist
 "The Human Factor"
 "Start the Fire"
 "In Mourning"
 "Fake Healer"
 "Badlands"
 "Date with Poverty"

Dangerous Toys setlist

 "Sportin' A Woody"
 "Sticks & Stones"
 "Sugar, Leather & The Nail"
"Angel N U"
 "Line' Em Up"
 "Gimmie No Lip"
 "Scared"
 "Teas'n Pleas'n"

Motörhead setlist

 "Doctor Rock" or "I'll Be Your Sister"
 "Traitor"
 "No Voices in the Sky"
 "Metropolis"
 "The One to Sing the Blues"
 "I'm So Bad (Baby I Don't Care)"
 "Going to Brazil"
 "Love Me Forever"
 "Angel City"
 "Killed By Death"
 "Ace of Spades"

Alice Cooper setlist

 "Under My Wheels"
 "Trash"
 "No More Mr. Nice Guy"
 "Billion Dollar Babies"
 "Love's a Loaded Gun"
 "Bed of Nails"
 "I'm Eighteen"
 "I Love the Dead / Devil's Food / Steven / Black Widow Jam"
 "Sick Things"
 "Feed My Frankenstein"
 "Cold Ethyl"
 "Only Women Bleed"
 "Poison"
 "Go to Hell"
 "School's Out"

Encore:

"Hey Stoopid"
"Elected"

Judas Priest setlist

 "Hell Bent for Leather"
 "Heading Out to the Highway"
 "The Hellion"
 "Electric Eye"
 "Diamonds & Rust" (Joan Baez cover) (Dropped after 14 July 1991)
 "All Guns Blazing"
 "Metal Gods"
 "Some Heads Are Gonna Roll"
 "The Ripper"
 "Night Crawler"
 "A Touch of Evil"
 "Painkiller"
 "The Green Manalishi (With the Two Prong Crown)" (Fleetwood Mac cover)
 "Breaking the Law"
 "Living After Midnight"
 "You've Got Another Thing Comin'"

"Turbo Lover" and "Victim of Changes" were also occasionally performed.

Tour dates

References 

Judas Priest concert tours
1991 concert tours
Alice Cooper concert tours